Cassiopea andromeda is one of many cnidarian species called the upside-down jellyfish. It usually lives in intertidal sand or mudflats, shallow lagoons, and around mangroves. This jellyfish, often mistaken for a sea anemone, usually keeps its mouth facing upward. Its yellow-brown bell, which has white or pale streaks and spots, pulsates to run water through its arms for respiration and to gather food.

Alimentation and strategies
Cassiopea andromeda is carnivorous and eats small animals from the sea or just pieces of them after it paralyzes its prey with its mucus and nematocysts when they are released. This jellyfish also lives in a symbiotic relationship with photosynthetic dinoflagellate algae, the zooxanthellae, and with shrimps. The zooxanthellae live in the tissues of the ventral surface of its body and it is the responsible for the color of it. As the zooxanthellae gets food for the Cassiopea andromeda, in response, it gets the sunlight that is necessary for the photosynthetic dinoflagellate algae. Therefore, the shrimp has a different symbiotic relationship with this jellyfish. It lives in its tentacles and protects it by taking the parasites off. In exchange, the Cassiopea andromeda mainly offers protection to the shrimp from the environment. This symbiotic relationship is called mutualism, where both species benefit from their interactions.

Reproduction
As a cnidarian, this jellyfish has an asexual and sexual reproduction. It reproduces by budding when it is in a polyp form. When it is in a medusa form, it reproduces sexually. The medusa female produces the eggs and keeps them. As the male produces the sperm and releases them in the water, the female uses its tentacles to bring the sperm to fertilize its eggs.

Size
This jellyfish can measure a maximum of 30.0 cm wide.

Interactions with humans
The species can deliver a painful sting. Symptoms include mild pain, rash, and swelling.

External links
Cassiopea andromeda, Introduced Marine Species of Hawaii Guidebook
Cassiopea andromeda (Upside-Down Jellyfish)
Bud formation and metamorphosis inCassiopea andromeda (Cnidaria: Scyphozoa): A developmental and ultrastructural study
WoRMS - World Register of Marine Species - Cassiopea andromeda (Forskål, 1775)
ADW: Cassiopeia andromeda: Information
 

Cassiopea
Animals described in 1775
Taxa named by Peter Forsskål